Cutolo is an Italian surname. Notable people with the surname include:

Alessandro Cutolo (1899–1995), Italian academic, television presenter, actor and historian
Aniello Cutolo (born 1983), Italian footballer
Frank Cutolo (born 1976), American player of Canadian football
Myriam Cutolo (born 1984), Italian yacht racer
Raffaele Cutolo (1941–2021), Italian crime boss
Rosetta Cutolo (born 1937), sister of Raffaele Cutolo
William Cutolo (1949–1999), American mobster

Italian-language surnames